Mirocastnia canis is a moth in the Castniidae family. It is found in Peru.

The length of the forewings is about 29.4 mm.

References

Moths described in 1923
Castniidae